|}

The Finale Juvenile Hurdle is a Grade 2 National Hunt hurdle race in Great Britain which is open to horses aged three years. It is run at Chepstow over a distance of about 2 miles (2 miles and 11 yards, or 3,228 metres), and during its running there are eight hurdles to be jumped. The race is for novice hurdlers, and it is scheduled to take place each year during the Welsh Grand National meeting in late December. On occasions when the race has been postponed to January of the following year, the runners are aged four years.

The race carried Grade 1 status until the 2021 running. It was downgraded to Grade 2 by the British Horseracing Authority in 2022.

Records 
Leading jockey since 1971 (3 wins):
 Mick Fitzgerald – Mister Banjo (1999), Blue Shark (2005), Good Bye Simon (2006) 
 Richard Johnson – Franchoek (2007), Le Rocher (2013), Defi Du Seuil (2016)
 Daryl Jacob –  Me Voici (2009), Bristol De Mai (2014), We Have A Dream (2017) 

Leading trainer since 1971 (4 wins):
 Nicky Henderson – Mister Banjo (1999), Nas Na Riogh (2002), Blue Shark (2005), We Have A Dream (2017)

Winners since 1971 
{| class="sortable" | border="1" style="border-collapse: collapse; font-size:90%"
|- bgcolor="#77dd77" align="center"
! Year
! Winner
! Jockey
! Trainer
|-
|1971 || Ballytruckle  || G Thomas || David Gandolfo
|-
|1972 || Lightning Trial  || Bill Smith || Fred Rimell
|-
|1973 || Fighting Kate  || R Dickin || Frenchie Nicholson
|-
|1974 || Philorninsky  || M Wagner || Bill Marshall
|-
|1975 || Tiepolino  || Bob Champion || Josh Gifford
|-
|1976 || Decent Fellow  || Richard Linley || Toby Balding
|-
|1977 || Rodman  || John Francome || Fred Winter
|- bgcolor="#eeeeee"
|1978 Abandoned because of snow  ||
|-
|1979 || Good Ruler  || Ray Goldstein || G Beeson
|-
|1980 || Broadsword  || Peter Scudamore || David Nicholson
|-
|1981 || Brave Hussar  || Andy Turnell || Bob Turnell
|-
|1982 || Primrolla  || Hywel Davies || David Nicholson
|-
|1983 || Dodgy Future  || Mark Perrett || Stan Mellor
|-
|1984 || Out of The Gloom  || Jonjo O'Neill || Reg Hollinshead
|-
|1985 || The Footman  || Graham Bradley || David Elsworth
|-
|1986 || High Knowl  || Peter Scudamore || Martin Pipe
|-
|1987 || South Parade  || Graham Bradley || Toby Balding
|-
| 1988
| width=170px | Enemy Action
| width=190px | Peter Scudamore
| width=190px | Martin Pipe
|-
| 1989
| Crystal Heights
| Brendan Powell
| Jackie Retter
|-
| 1990
| Hopscotch
| Jonothan Lower
| Martin Pipe
|-
| 1991
| Good Profile
| Lorcan Wyer
| George M. Moore
|-
| 1992
| Dare to Dream
| David Bridgwater
| Reg Akehurst
|-
| 1993
| Mysilv
| Adrian Maguire
| David Nicholson
|- bgcolor="#eeeeee"
|1994 Abandoned due to Waterlogging  ||
|-
|- bgcolor="#eeeeee"
|1995 Abandoned due to Frost  ||
|-
|- bgcolor="#eeeeee"
|1996 Abandoned due to Frost  ||
|-
| 1997
| Rainwatch
| Tony McCoy
| Martin Pipe
|-
| 1998
| Hunt Hill
| Adrian Maguire
| Jonjo O'Neill
|-
| 1999
| Mister Banjo
| Mick Fitzgerald
| Nicky Henderson
|-
| 2000
| Jair du Cochet
| Jacques Ricou
| Guillaume Macaire
|-
| 2001
| Tempo d'Or
| Benoît Gicquel
| Guillaume Macaire
|-
| 2002
| Nas Na Riogh
| Marcus Foley
| Nicky Henderson
|-
| 2003
| Sunray
| Andrew Thornton
| Evan Williams
|-
| 2004
| Phar Bleu
| Tony McCoy
| Georgie Browne
|-
| 2005
| Blue Shark
| Mick Fitzgerald
| Nicky Henderson
|-
| 2006
| Good Bye Simon
| Mick Fitzgerald
| Thierry Doumen
|-
| 2007
| Franchoek
| Richard Johnson
| Alan King
|-
| 2008
| Walkon
| Robert Thornton
| Alan King
|-
| 2009
| Me Voici
| Daryl Jacob
| Nick Williams
|-
| 2010
| Marsh Warbler
| Fearghal Davis
| Brian Ellison
|-
| 2011
| Hollow Tree
| Timmy Murphy
| Donald McCain Jr
|-
| 2012
| Ruacana
| Denis O'Regan
| John Ferguson
|-
| 2013
| Le Rocher
| Richard Johnson
| Nick Williams
|-
| 2014
| Bristol De Mai
| Daryl Jacob
| Nigel Twiston-Davies
|-
| 2015
| Adrien Du Pont
| Nick Scholfield
| Paul Nicholls
|-
| 2016
| Defi Du Seuil
| Richard Johnson
| Philip Hobbs
|-
| 2017
| We Have A Dream
| Daryl Jacob
| Nicky Henderson
|-
| 2018
| Quel Destin
| Sam Twiston-Davies
| Paul Nicholls
|-
| 2019
| Allmankind
| Harry Skelton
| Dan Skelton
|-
| 2020
| Adagio
| Tom Scudamore
| David Pipe
|-
| 2021
| Porticello
| Jamie Moore
| Gary Moore
|-
| 2022
| Comfort Zone 
| Jonjo O'Neill Jr
| Joseph O'Brien
|}

See also 
 Horse racing in Great Britain
 List of British National Hunt races

References 

 Racing Post:

 pedigreequery.com – Finale Juvenile Hurdle – Chepstow.

National Hunt races in Great Britain
Chepstow Racecourse
National Hunt hurdle races